Loy Mendonsa is an Indian music director and part of the Shankar–Ehsaan–Loy trio which consist of himself, Shankar Mahadevan and Ehsaan Noorani. Before becoming a music composer, he played piano and keyboards for famous Indian music composers such as A. R. Rahman and Nadeem-Shravan. His daughter, Alyssa Mendonsa, made her singing debut with the song Uff Teri Adaa from the movie Karthik Calling Karthik.

Loy Mendonsa started his career by composing the signature tune for 'The World This Week' show on Doordarshan.

Awards and nominations
National Film Awards
2004: Best Music Direction win for Kal Ho Naa Ho

IIFA Awards
2004: Best Music Direction win for Kal Ho Naa Ho

2006: Best Music Direction win for Bunty aur Babli

Filmfare Awards
2001: RD Burman Award for New Music Talent win for Dil Chahta Hai

2001: Best Music Direction nomination for Dil Chahta Hai

2003: Best Music Direction win for Kal Ho Naa Ho

2005: Best Music Direction win for Bunty Aur Babli

Star Screen Awards
2000: Best Background Music nomination for Mission Kashmir

2001: Best Music Direction win for Dil Chahta Hai

2005: Best Music Direction win for Bunty aur Babli

Zee Cine Awards
2006: Best Music Director win for Bunty aur Babli

Filmography as music composers

References

External links
 Shankar–Ehsaan–Loy (official site)
 

Living people
Indian male playback singers
Indian film score composers
Year of birth missing (living people)
Indian male film score composers